Niebla is a genus of abelisaurid theropod dinosaur from the Late Cretaceous Period (Campanian-Maastrichtian) of Río Negro province, Argentina. The genus contains a single species, Niebla antiqua, and is known from a partial, non-articulated skeleton. The holotype, found in the Allen Formation, represents an adult individual.

Discovery and naming 
The fossil material includes a near-complete braincase, fragmentary jaw and teeth, relatively complete scapulocoracoid, dorsal ribs and incomplete vertebrae.

The genus name Niebla comes from the Spanish word for "mist", referring to the foggy days during the excavation of the fossil. The specific name, antiqua, is derived from a Latin word meaning "old."

Description 
Niebla represents one of the most derived abelisaurids. Despite its relatively small size, especially when compared to related dinosaurs like Carnotaurus, the holotype represents an adult.

The scapulocoracoid is notably similar to that of Carnotaurus in having a posterodorsally oriented glenoid, a dorsoventrally expanded and wide coraco-scapular plate, and a very narrow and straight scapular blade. These features are very different from those of other abelisaurids, which may indicate a unique conformation of the pectoral girdle among these South American theropods.

Paleoecology 
Niebla is known from the Allen Formation of Argentina. The pterosaur Aerotitan, as well as theropods (Quilmesaurus, Bonapartenykus, Austroraptor), sauropods (Bonatitan, Pellegrinisaurus, Rocasaurus) and ornithopods (Lapampasaurus, Bonapartesaurus), are also known from the formation.

References 

Abelisaurids
Maastrichtian life
Late Cretaceous dinosaurs of South America
Cretaceous Argentina
Fossils of Argentina
Allen Formation
Fossil taxa described in 2020